Coprosma autumnalis or C. grandifolia according to earlier Colenso authority,  (In Māori: kanono or raurēkau) is a native forest shrub of New Zealand. Its widespread in both the North and South Islands, and has the largest leaves of any New Zealand coprosma.

Kanono is found in wet and shaded forest areas where it can grow to 6 metres high. Its leaves often have a mottled appearance.

Kanono produces ripe orange fruit between February and May, then flowers around April.

C. autumnalis is more commonly known by its earlier name Coprosma grandifolia

References 

Flora of New Zealand
autumnalis
Taxa named by William Colenso